Sweitzer Lake may refer to:

Sweitzer Lake State Park, a state park in Colorado
Sweitzer Lake (Minnesota), a lake in Minnesota